Mohamed Abicha (born 16 January 1980) is a Moroccan volleyball player.

Career highlights 
Alongside Zouheir El Graoui, Abicha won the gold medal at the 2017 African Beach Volleyball Championships in Maputo and the 2019 African Beach Volleyball Championships in Abuja, the bronze medal at the 2019 All-Africa Beach Games in Sal and the silver medal at the 2019 African Games in Rabat.

2020 Tokyo Summer Olympics 
Abicha represented Morocco at the 2020 Summer Olympics alongside Zouheir El Graoui. The duo were defeated in all three beach volleyball events.

References

External links 
 

1980 births
Living people
Moroccan men's volleyball players
Moroccan beach volleyball players
Men's beach volleyball players
Olympic beach volleyball players of Morocco
Beach volleyball players at the 2020 Summer Olympics
African Games medalists in volleyball
People from Fez, Morocco
Competitors at the 2019 African Games
African Games silver medalists for Morocco
20th-century Moroccan people
21st-century Moroccan people